Nomophila africana is a moth in the family Crambidae. It was described by Eugene G. Munroe in 1973. It is found in South Africa.

References

Endemic moths of South Africa
Moths described in 1973
Spilomelinae